Kirsten Olson (born October 20, 1991) is an American former figure skater and actress. As an actress, Olson played the role of Nikki Fletcher, the 'Jumping Shrimp,' in the Disney movie Ice Princess (2005). As a figure skater, Olson placed fifth on the novice level at the 2005 United States Figure Skating Championships and came in ninth at the junior level at the 2007 Nationals. She represents the Starlight Ice Dance Club in the Twin Cities, Minnesota and is coached by Page Lipe. Though she no longer skates competitively, Olson has been coaching for the last few years. Olson graduated from Burnsville High School in 2010 and UW-LaCrosse in 2014.

Competitive highlights

 N = Novice level; J = Junior level

Filmography

References

External links
 
 USFSA's feature on Ice Princess
 UnseenSkaters Interview
 2007 Nationals profile
 Tracings.net profile
 

American female single skaters
American child actresses
Living people
1991 births
People from Burnsville, Minnesota
Sportspeople from Minnesota
People from Savage, Minnesota
21st-century American women